Justin Willis (born July 19, 1987) is an American professional mixed martial artist competing in the Heavyweight division.  A professional competitor since 2012, he has formerly competed for the World Series of Fighting and the Ultimate Fighting Championship.

Background
Born and raised in California, Willis played football through high school and the collegiate level as a lineman at San Jose State University, graduating with a degree in sociology. At the collegiate level, Willis was All-Conference.

Mixed martial arts career

Early career
Willis made his amateur debut in 2009, a second-round loss, before competing again as an amateur bout on the Strikeforce: Diaz vs. Noons 2 against Steve Dickey. Willis won via unanimous decision . After going professional in 2012, he amassed a record of 4–1 before being signed by the UFC.

Ultimate Fighting Championship
Willis made his promotional debut on July 16, 2017 against James Mulheron at UFC Fight Night: Nelson vs. Ponzinibbio. He won via unanimous decision.

He then faced Allen Crowder at UFC 218 on December 2, 2017 and won via knockout in the first round.

He faced Chase Sherman on April 21, 2018 at UFC Fight Night 128 and won by unanimous decision.

He faced Mark Hunt on December 2, 2018 at UFC Fight Night 142 and won by unanimous decision.

Willis faced Curtis Blaydes on March 23, 2019 at UFC Fight Night 148. Blaydes continually took Willis down and controlled him and also scored a knockdown in the second round. Willis lost the fight via unanimous decision. Willis spent a good amount of the pre-fight press time taunting Blaydes, who responded in kind in his post-fight interview, referring to Willis as "Big Titty".

On May 24, 2019, it was reported that Willis was released from UFC.

Professional Fighters League 
On February 11, 2020, news surfaced that Willis had signed with the PFL and was expected to compete in the PFL 2021 heavyweight season.

Willis was expected to make his debut against Denis Goltsov at PFL 3 on May 6, 2021, but was removed from the fight prior to weigh-ins.

Mixed martial arts record

|-
|Loss
|align=center|8–2
|Curtis Blaydes
|Decision (unanimous)
|UFC Fight Night: Thompson vs. Pettis 
|
|align=center|3
|align=center|5:00
|Nashville, Tennessee, United States
| 
|-
|Win
|align=center|8–1
|Mark Hunt
|Decision (unanimous)
|UFC Fight Night: dos Santos vs. Tuivasa 
|
|align=center|3
|align=center|5:00
|Adelaide, Australia
|  
|-
|Win
|align=center|7–1
|Chase Sherman
|Decision (unanimous)
|UFC Fight Night: Barboza vs. Lee
|
|align=center|3
|align=center|5:00
|Atlantic City, New Jersey, United States
|
|-
|Win
|align=center|6–1
|Allen Crowder
|KO (punch)
|UFC 218
|
|align=center|1
|align=center|2:33
|Detroit, Michigan, United States
|
|-
|Win
|align=center|5–1
|James Mulheron
|Decision (unanimous)
|UFC Fight Night: Nelson vs. Ponzinibbio 
|
|align=center|3
|align=center|5:00
|Glasgow, Scotland
|
|-
|Win
|align=center|4–1
|Julian Coutinho
|TKO (punches)
|WSOF 31
|
|align=center|2
|align=center|0:30
|Mashantucket, Connecticut, United States
|
|-
|Win
|align=center|3–1
|Rizvan Kuniev
|Decision (unanimous)
|Inoki Genome Fight 4
|
|align=center|2
|align=center|5:00
|Tokyo, Japan
|
|-
|Win
|align=center|2–1
|Yusuke Kawaguchi
|TKO (punches)
|Inoki Bom-Ba-Ye 2014
|
|align=center|1
|align=center|0:43
|Tokyo, Japan
|
|-
|Win
|align=center|1–1
|James Kirby
|TKO (punches)
|Global Knockout: The Return
|
|align=center|1
|align=center|N/A
|Jackson, California, United States
|
|-
|Loss
|align=center|0–1
|Henry Solis
|TKO (elbows)
|ROF 43: Bad Blood
|
|align=center|2
|align=center|4:32
|Broomfield, Colorado, United States
|

See also
List of male mixed martial artists

References

External links
 Justin Willis at PFL
 
 

1987 births
Living people
American male mixed martial artists
Heavyweight mixed martial artists
Mixed martial artists from California
San Jose State Spartans football players
Ultimate Fighting Championship male fighters